The University of Houston Law Center is the law school of the University of Houston in Houston, Texas.  Founded in 1947, the Law Center is one of 12 colleges of the University of Houston, a state university. It is accredited by the American Bar Association and is a member of the Association of American Law Schools.  The law school's facilities are located on the university's 667-acre campus in southeast Houston.

The Law Center awards the Juris Doctor (J.D.) and Master of Laws (LL.M.) degrees. The law school ranked 56th in the 2018 U.S. News & World Report law school rankings.

According to UHLC's official 2021 ABA-required disclosures,  92.06% of the Class of 2021 was employed and 84.58% obtained full-time, long-term, Bar Admission Required or JD-required employment 10 months after graduation.

The dean of the Law Center is Leonard M. Baynes.

History
The University of Houston Law Center was founded in 1947 as the University of Houston College of Law, with an inaugural class consisting of 28 students and a single professor. The law school was housed in several locations on campus in its first few years—including temporary classrooms and the basement of the M.D. Anderson Library. The College of Law moved into its current facilities—located at the northeast corner of campus—shortly following its groundbreaking in 1969.

In 1969, the college was renamed the Bates College of Law for Col. William B. Bates, former member of the University of Houston System Board of Regents and College of Law founding committee. Since 1982, the College of Law has been commonly referred to as the University of Houston Law Center.

In 2005, the University of Houston Law Center opened its facilities to Loyola University New Orleans College of Law after it was severely damaged in Hurricane Katrina, hosting 320 of the Loyola's 800 students taught by 31 Loyola law professors, allowing the Loyola students' education to continue uninterrupted.

Rankings

The law school was tied for 50th in the 2016 U.S. News & World Report law school rankings. U.S. News also ranks the school in three specialties: second for health care law, seventh for intellectual property law, and sixth among part-time programs.

In 2010, the school ranked 34th for number of alumni included on the Super Lawyers list. The National Law Journal reported that the Law Center ranked 29th for the percentage of its graduates hired as first-year associates at the nation's 250 largest law firms in 2013. In 2013, the influential law blog "Above the Law" ranked the school 35th on its "Above the Law Top 50 Law Schools List."

The 2021 US News & World Report rankings named the University of Houston Law Center the 56th best law school in the United States.

Facts
As of fall 2014, the law school reported a total enrollment of 732 students, and employs a total of 273 full- and part-time faculty on staff.

For the class of 2016, the school received 2,208 applications, with 231 full-time and part-time students matriculating. The median undergraduate GPA among all students at the school is 3.47, and the median LSAT score was 159. The class of 2016 is 63.6 percent white and 43.9% female.

Of the 2013 graduating class, 62% work in law firms, 23% in business and industry, 8% in government, 3% in public interest, and 2% as judicial clerks. The average school bar examination passage rate for the July 2013 was 88.02%.

Annual tuition for the 2015–2016 full-time program is $29,784 for Texas residents and $43,044 for non-Texas residents. Annual tuition for the part-time program is $26,541 for Texas residents and $38,961 for non-Texas residents.

Academics
The J.D. program is 90 semester hours. Entering classes are generally divided into three full-time day sessions of some 60 students each and one part-time evening section of some 35 students for first-year courses.

The Law Center has eight special programs and institutes:
 Blakely Advocacy Institute
 Center for Children, Law & Policy
 Center for Consumer Law
 Criminal Justice Institute
 The Environment, Energy, & Natural Resource Center
 Health Law & Policy Institute
 Institute for Higher Education Law & Governance
 Institute for Intellectual Property & Information Law

The Law Center offers several law clinics for upper-division students: the Civil Clinic, Civil Practice Clinic, Criminal Practice Clinic, Consumer Law Clinic, Domestic Violence Clinic, Immigration Clinic, Juvenile Defense Clinic, Mediation Clinic, and Transactional Clinic.

O'Quinn Law Library
The O'Quinn Law Library is the school's law library. The director of the library is Amanda Watson. The library has some 435,000 volumes. The library has three special collections:
 The Frankel Rare Books Collection is a closed-stack collection of rare and out of print books and documents as well as publications of the Law Center faculty.
 The Judge Brown Admiralty Collection is an admiralty and maritime law collection. Established mainly from an endowment by Houston admiralty lawyers, the collection is named in honor of Judge John Robert Brown, a Houston admiralty attorney who served on the Fifth Circuit. The entire collection was lost during Tropical Storm Allison, but was rebuilt through the Albertus book replacement project, completed in 2007.
 The Foreign & International Law Collection, which includes books and other documents on Mexican law.

Tropical Storm Allison flooded the library's lower level with eight feet of water in June 2001, destroying 174,000 books and the microfiche collection. The Federal Emergency Management Agency (FEMA) gave $21.4 million to rebuild the library collection, which was 75 percent of the replacement cost. The collection has since been rebuilt.

Journals and publications
The Law Center publishes five law journals. The Houston Law Review, established in 1963, is the school's main law journal.

The four specialty journals are the Houston Business and Tax Law Journal (business law, tax law; founded in 2001), the Houston Journal of Health Law and Policy (health care law), the Houston Journal of International Law (international law), and the Journal of Consumer & Commercial Law (commercial law).

Employment 
According to UHLC's official 2021 ABA-required disclosures, 92.06% of the Class of 2021 was employed and 84.58% obtained full-time, long-term, Bar Admission Required or JD-required employment 10 months after graduation.

Costs
The total cost of attendance (indicating the cost of tuition, fees, and living expenses) at UHLC for the 2013–2014 academic year is $48,478 for a resident and $58,699 for a nonresident. The Law School Transparency estimated debt-financed cost of attendance for three years is $197,267 for residents and $239,808 for nonresidents.

Notable alumni
Fortunato Benavides, judge on the U.S. Court of Appeals for the Fifth Circuit
 Jeff Brown, justice of the Texas Supreme Court
Nandita Berry, former secretary of state of Texas and Houston lawyer
 Joseph S. Cage Jr. former US Attorney for the district of western Louisiana 
Anne Clutterbuck, lawyer and politician
David Cobb, social activist lawyer, U.S. Green Party candidate
Marcia A. Crone, judge for the United States District Court for the Eastern District of Texas 
William F. Downes, federal judge
Eni Faleomavaega, non-voting delegate to the United States House of Representatives from American Samoa's At-large congressional district.
Gene Green, U.S. representative 
Vanessa Gilmore, Judge 
Richard "Racehorse" Haynes, famous criminal defense attorney
Randy Hendricks, attorney and sports agent 
Donald Holmquest, lawyer and former NASA astronaut
Jolanda Jones, former Houston City Council member and Survivor contestant 
I. D. McMaster, former District Judge for the 179th Criminal Court
John O'Quinn, highest paid attorney in Texas and founding partner of The O'Quinn Law Firm
Daylin Leach State Senator for Pennsylvania
Gray H. Miller, judge 
John Moores, entrepreneur and philanthropist, and the owner of the San Diego Padres
David Newell, judge
Frances Northcutt, technical staff on NASA's Apollo Program, women’s and abortion rights advocate
Dora Olivo, former state representative 
Larry Phillips, Republican member of the Texas House of Representatives since 2003 from Sherman 
Ted Poe, Congressman 
Michael H. Schneider Sr., judge 
Ruby Kless Sondock, first female Texas Supreme Court Justice
Star Jones, television personality, lawyer and author; former co-host, The View, former Assistant District Attorney in New York 
Olen Underwood, Judge 
Richard Waites, President/CEO of The Advocates, an international trial consulting firm
Royce West, state senator 
Randa Williams, billionaire
John Whitmire, state senator 
Samuel F. Wright, Washington DC-based attorney active in veterans issues; lobbied on behalf of the fraudulent U.S. Navy Veterans Association
Juan F. Vasquez, judge at United States Tax Court
Philip D. Zelikow, executive director of the 9/11 Commission and Counselor of the United States Department of State
Tony Buzbee, Houston trial attorney, and member of the Texas A&M University System Board of Regents
Phyllis Frye, the first transgender judge in the United States
Cody Vasut, state representative

References

External links

Law schools in Texas
Law Center
Educational institutions established in 1947
1947 establishments in Texas